Scott W. Lucas (1892–1968) was a U.S. Senator from Illinois from 1939 to 1951. Senator Lucas may also refer to:

David Lucas (politician) (born 1950), Georgia State Senate
Frank Lucas (Wyoming politician) (1876–1948), Wyoming State Senate
Jeanne Hopkins Lucas (1935–2007), North Carolina State Senate
Louise Lucas (born 1944), Virginia State Senate
Robert Lucas (governor) (1781–1853), Ohio State Senate